Ankara Castle is an historic fortification in the city of Ankara, Turkey, constructed in or after the 7th century. The earliest fortification on the site was constructed in the 8th century BC by the Phrygians and rebuilt in 278 BC by the Galatians. The castle was rebuilt or renovated under the Roman, Byzantine, Seljuk, and Ottoman empires.

History and architecture
The castle is composed of an inner line of walls with closely spaced towers that encloses an area of about 350m by 150m, and an outer line of walls with towers some 40m apart. Both sets of walls were constructed using large quantities of reused masonry. The exact dates of their construction are uncertain, but both postdate the capture and destruction of Ankara by the Persians in, probably, 622 AD (Foss considers that the inner walls may date from the reign of Constans II; the outer walls are generally believed to have been erected slightly later).

See also
History of Ankara

References

External links

 Ankara Castle (in Turkish)
 150+ pictures of citadel and views around it
 Municipality of Ankara

Castles in Turkey
Buildings and structures in Ankara
Forts in Turkey
Tourist attractions in Ankara
Byzantine fortifications in Turkey
Altındağ, Ankara